Nite Flights may refer to:

 "Nite Flights" (song), a song by the Walker Brothers 
 Nite Flights (album), a 1978 album by the Walker Brothers